Ross Edward Sutton  (7 January 1938 – 22 July 2000) was the first Australian Paralympic gold medallist. He represented Australia in archery at the 1960 Summer Paralympics in Rome, Italy and dartchery and fencing at the 1962 Commonwealth Paraplegic Games in Perth, Western Australia. Sutton also competed in table tennis at the Second National Paraplegic Games.

Personal life 

Sutton was the eldest of five children and his parents were Edward and Ivy. His mother died when he was 12. Sutton helped his father to run their farm in Guyra, New South Wales.  At the age of 15, the family moved to Armidale, New South Wales.

On 20 April 1958, 21-year-old Sutton was involved in a Tiger Moth plane crash in Boorolong near Armidale whilst taking a flying lesson. The crash left him paralysed. Peter FitzSimons described the background to the crash. Sutton was in love with a young woman in the region and decided to drop a lover letter to her whilst flying. FitzSimons noted that Sutton had realised after he dropped it "that it was not sufficiently weighted and his love was 'blowin' in the wind', like a mad thing. Ross doubled the Moth back to try to catch it … and crashed."  There was some delay in receiving help, eventually he was taken to Armidale and New England Hospital with little chance of surviving. He was later flown to the Royal North Shore Hospital in Sydney where he was treated for chest and facial injuries and a broken spine.

Sutton was submitted to the Mount Wilga Rehabilitation Centre, and during his time there he completed a six-year watchmaking course in two-and-a-half years at Sydney Technical College in Ultimo, New South Wales. Sutton was immobile from the chest down, and as a resident of the rehabilitation facility he was forced to participate in sport for physiotherapy. This is where he began competing in archery, basketball, dartchery, fencing, javelin, shot put and table tennis.

In 1964, Sutton married Josephine Lavender and they adopted three children, Stuart, Yvette and Aletta. Sutton died on 22 July 2000, just months before he was due to carry the Paralympic Torch on the final day of the relay in Sydney for the 2000 Games. His son Stuart ran on his behalf.

Career

1960 Summer Paralympics 
Sutton attended the first Summer Paralympics in Rome, Italy after undergoing two years of rehabilitation. He won a gold medal in Men's St Nicholas round open archery, the French Challenge Cup and Medal for the best Individual score with 670. This was Australia's first gold medal at the Paralympic Games. Sutton made the following comments regarding his selection "Life is what you make of it I say. Just because you are in a wheelchair, you don’t have to shut yourself away, as some other handicapped people do. I have heard that there are three or four people in wheelchairs in Armidale, and I hope to be able to show them that they can lead useful lives too."

1962 Commonwealth Paraplegic Games 
At the 1962 Commonwealth Paraplegic Games in Perth, Western Australia, Sutton won a gold medal in doubles dartchery, a silver medal in Men's Team Sabre Fencing and a bronze medal in the Gentleman FITA Round and Gentleman Windsor Round.

Australian Paralympic Committee 
Sutton's family donated his gold medal, with two bows, a box of arrows and various pieces of archery equipment to the Australian Paralympic Committee (APC), in what is arguably the most significant piece of sporting memorabilia in the APC's collection. His medal and equipment have been on display at the National Sports Museum. In 2013, the Chief Executive of the Australian Paralympic Committee at the time, Mr Jason Hellwig, stated that "The achievements of Ross, Daphne and all of our first Paralympians are historically significant to Australia, not only because they won our first Paralympic gold medals but also because their achievements marked a turning point and positive move forward for people with a disability in this country."

References

Paralympic archers of Australia
Archers at the 1960 Summer Paralympics
Paralympic gold medalists for Australia
Wheelchair category Paralympic competitors
Medalists at the 1960 Summer Paralympics
People from Armidale
Australian male archers
Australian male fencers
People with paraplegia
1937 births
2000 deaths
Paralympic medalists in archery
Sportsmen from New South Wales